The Norwegian National Collection Agency is a Norwegian government agency responsible for the collection of all fines issued by the police as well as debt collection from defaulted government taxes or other government debts. The agency was founded in 1990 and is located in Mo i Rana. From 2015 Statens innkrevingssentral was included in The Norwegian Tax Administration.

Government agencies of Norway
Financial services companies of Norway
1990 establishments in Norway